The 18th Arkansas Infantry (Marmaduke's) (1861–1865) was a Confederate Army infantry regiment during the American Civil War. The unit was also briefly identified as the 1st Arkansas Infantry Battalion. The unit was most often referred to as the 3rd Confederate Infantry Regiment. The designation "Confederate Infantry Regiment" was intended to convey the difference between Provisional Confederate Army units and Regular Confederate Army Units, with Provisional units being those regiments who received a state designation such as "XX Arkansas Infantry Regiment". In practice, the designation was most often utilized when Regiments were assembled utilizing companies from more than one Confederate state. The "3rd Confederate Infantry Regiment" is occasionally misidentified as the 3rd Arkansas Infantry Regiment commanded by Colonel Van H. Manning.

Organization
The 18th Arkansas Infantry started out as 7 of 22 companies which comprised the so-called "Hindman Legion." Col. Thomas C. Hindman had recruited ten companies at his own expense for the 2nd Arkansas Infantry Regiment, and then an additional seven companies at his own expense which, along with four cavalry companies and an artillery battery, became known as the Hindman Legion. The "Legion" was not approved as an organization, and, after being mustered into the Confederate service on July 27, 1861, reverted to a regiment (the 2nd Arkansas Infantry Regiment), an infantry battalion (the 1st Arkansas Infantry Battalion) and a cavalry battalion (the 6th Arkansas Cavalry Battalion). Capt. John S. Marmaduke was assigned as commander of the 1st Arkansas Infantry Battalion and promoted to lieutenant-colonel on August 1, 1861. A company from the 15th Tennessee Infantry was transferred to the 1st Arkansas Battalion, and two additional companies were added on December 18, 1861, which brought the battalion up to ten companies. On January 1, 1862, the unit was formally designated as a regiment, the 18th Arkansas Infantry, and Marmaduke was promoted to colonel. On January 31, 1862, the regiment was redesignated as the 3rd Confederate Infantry because it contained units from multiple states. Capt. John S. Marmaduke was assigned as commander of the 1st Arkansas Battalion and promoted to lieutenant-colonel on August 1, 1861. A company from the 15th Tennessee Infantry was transferred to the 1st Arkansas Battalion, and two additional companies were added on December 18, 1861, which brought the battalion up to ten companies. On January 1, 1862, the unit was formally designated as a regiment—the 18th Arkansas Infantry—and Marmaduke was promoted to colonel. On January 31, 1862, the regiment was redesignated as the 3rd Confederate Infantry.

The 3rd Confederate Infantry was composed of the following companies:

Company A – the "Little Rock Grays" – of Pulaski County, Arkansas, commanded by Captain James B. Johnson. This company was originally Company L, 1st Arkansas Infantry Battalion.
Company B – the "Young Guard" – of Shelby County, Tennessee, commanded by Captain John F. Cameron.
Company C – the "Fletcher Rifles" – of Mississippi County, Arkansas, commanded by Captain Elliot H. Fletcher Sr., This company was originally Company O, 1st Arkansas Infantry Battalion.
Company D – the "Shamrock Guards" – of Warren County, Mississippi, commanded by Captain John H. Crump. This company was originally Company P, 1st Arkansas Infantry Battalion.
Company E – the "Linden Dead-Shots" – of St. Francis County, Arkansas, commanded by Captain Poindexter Dunn. This company was originally organized as a volunteer militian company in the 19th Regiment, Arkansas State Militia, from St. Francis County, with militia commissions being issued to its officers on May 16, 1861.  The company was assigned as Company Q, 1st Arkansas Infantry Battalion. This company was originally organized as a volunteer company in the 19th Regiment, Arkansas State Militia on May 16, 1861.
Company F – the "Chalk Bluff Rebels" – of Greene County, Arkansas, commanded by Captain William Reed. This company was originally Company R, 1st Arkansas Infantry Battalion.
Company G – the "Pine Bluff Artillery" – of Jefferson County, Arkansas, commanded by Captain Fredrick P. Steck. This company was originally Company S, 1st Arkansas Infantry Battalion. This company was originally organized as a volunteer artillery company in the 34th Regiment, Arkansas State Militia on April 21, 1861.
Company H – the "Swamp Rangers" – of Warren County, Mississippi, commanded by Captain H. V. Keep. This company was originally Company T, 1st Arkansas Infantry Battalion. The company was consolidated with Company E on January 22, 1862.
Company I – the "Burrowville Mountain Guards" – of Searcy County, Arkansas, commanded by Captain John J. Dawson. This company was originally Company ??, 1st Arkansas Infantry Battalion. The company was composed mostly of suspected members of the Arkansas Peace Society from Searcy County. They were rounded up by Confederate authorities and brought to Little Rock and given a choice of enlisting in the Confederate army or going to prison. The company was consolidated with Company A on April 23, 1862.
Company K – the "Rector Guards" – of Searcy County, Arkansas, commanded by Captain Ira G. Robertson.

Note: Companies I and K were composed primarily of suspected members of the so-called Arkansas Peace Society, who were arrested and sent to Little Rock by members of the 45th Arkansas Militia Regiment, where they were given the choice of Confederate service or imprisonment. Most of the men were from Searcy County. The officers were non-Peace Society men appointed by the Governor.

Service record

Assigned to Hindman's Brigade, Hardee's Division in the Army of Central Kentucky from December 1861 through January 1862. The unit was involved in an engagement at Rowlett's Station, Kentucky, on December 17, 1861. Assigned to Hindman's (later Liddell's) brigade, Army of Mississippi in March, 1862 where it participated in the Battle of Shiloh on April 6–7, 1862 and in the Corinth Campaign from April through June of that year. At the battle of Shiloh the 3rd Confederate bore the guiding colors of Hindman's Brigade and captured the first prisoners of the day. Colonel Marmaduke was mentioned with praise in the official reports. In the second day's battle he was wounded and disabled, and while in hospital was recommended for promotion to the rank of brigadier-general. Colonel Marmaduke commanded his brigade of Arkansans during the Siege of Corinth, and later was ordered to the Department of the Trans-Mississippi.

In early May 1862 the Confederate forces underwent an army-wide reorganization due to the passage of the Conscription Act by the Confederate Congress in April 1862. All twelve-month regiments had to re-muster and enlist for two additional years or the duration of the war; a new election of officers was ordered; and men who were exempted from service by age or other reasons under the Conscription Act were allowed to take a discharge and go home. Officers who did not choose to stand for re-election were also offered a discharge. The reorganization was accomplished among all the Arkansas regiments in and around Corinth, Mississippi, following the Battle of Shiloh.

In the reorganization of Confederate forces before the start of the Kentucky Campaign, the 3rd Confederate, now under the command of Lieutenant Colonel Henry Virtner Keep was assigned to Brigadier General Sterling A. M. Wood's 4th Brigade of Major General Simon Bolivar Buckner's 3rd Division of Major General William Joseph Hardee's Corps of the Army of Mississippi. The regiment participated in Battle of Perryville, Kentucky, in October 1862.

In November 1862, following the Kentucky Campaign, General Bragg united his Army of Mississippi and the General Kirby Smith's Army of Kentucky to create the Army of Tennessee. In the reorganization, Wood's Brigade, including the 3rd Confederate now under the command of Major John F. Cameron, was assigned to Cleburne's Division and fought in the Battle of Stones River.  Major J. F. Cameron filed the after action report of the 3rd Confederate Infantry following the battle of Stone's River (Murfreesboro):

By the time of the Battle of Chickamauga, the 3rd Confederate had been field consolidated with the 5th Confederate Infantry due to battle losses and placed under the command of Colonel James A. Smith. The consolidated 3rd/5th Confederate Infantry was assigned to the brigade of Brigadier General Lucius E. Polk in Cleburn's Division of the Army of Tennessee.

When General Joseph E. Johnston assumed command of the Army of Tennessee to oppose General Sherman's Atlanta Campaign, the 3rd Confederate was assigned to Govan's Brigade. The 3rd Confederate participated in the battles of Dalton, Resaca, New Hope Church, Kennesaw Mountain, Atlanta, and the Siege of Atlanta. During the Battle of Atlanta on July 22, 1864, the 3rd Confederate had only 62 effectives and reported 9 casualties.

The regiment and it colors were captured, along with much of Govan's Brigade at the Battle of Jonesboro, Georgia, on Sept. 1, 1864. Due to a special cartel between Union General Sherman and Confederate General John B. Hood, the unit was quickly paroled and exchanged for Union prisoner held at Andersonville Prison. The regiment re-entered service approximately a month later.

The 3rd Arkansas and the rest of Govan's Brigade were released and exchanged just in time to participate in General John B. Hood's disastrous Franklin-Nashville Campaign. Brigade effective strength was approximately 550, plus or minus a dozen or so, so each battalion fielded around 100-110 rifles. The 3rd Confederate had 47 men left on the march into Franklin and so the 3rd found itself once again consolidated with the 5th Confederate Infantry under the command of Lieutenant Colonel E.A. Howell. The remnants of Govan's Brigade that survived the Tennessee Campaign remained with the Army of Tennessee through its final engagements in the 1865 Carolinas Campaign.

Consolidation and Surrender
The remnants of ten depleted Arkansas regiments, along with one mostly Arkansas regiment, in the Army of Tennessee were consolidated into a single regiment at Smithfield, North Carolina, on April 9, 1865. The 1st Arkansas, was lumped together with the 2nd, 5th, 6th, 7th, 8th, 15th, 19th and 24th Arkansas Infantry Regiments and the 3rd Confederate Infantry Regiment as the 1st Arkansas Consolidated Infantry on April 9, 1865. On April 26, 1865, the 1st Arkansas Consolidated Infantry Regiment was present with the Army of Tennessee when it surrendered in Greensboro, North Carolina.

Flag

This flag was issued in the spring of 1864 and bears characteristics similar to the other Hardee pattern flags issued to the division of Major General Patrick Cleburne, Army of Tennessee. It was captured on September 1, 1864, by the 113th Ohio Volunteer Infantry at the Battle of Jonesboro, Georgia. In his report dated September 10, 1864 Captain Toland Jones noted that "we captured the battle-flag of the Third Confederate Infantry Regiment inscribed with the names of seven different battles." The flag was eventually forwarded to the U.S. War Department where it was assigned Capture Number 227. The flag was mistakenly identified as belonging to an Alabama unit and when the Confederate battleflags were returned to the states in 1905, the flag was mistakenly returned to Alabama. In 2001, the flag was transferred to the Old State House Museum in Little Rock, Arkansas.

Battle participation
The 3rd Confederate Infantry took part in the following battles:

Battle of Rowlett's Station, Kentucky, December 17, 1861.
Battle of Shiloh, Tennessee, April 6–7, 1862.
Siege of Corinth, April to June 1862.
Kentucky Campaign, Kentucky, August–October, 1862.
Battle of Perryville, Kentucky, October 8, 1862.
Battle of Murfreesboro, Tennessee, December 31, 1862, to January 3, 1863.
Tullahoma Campaign, June 1863.
Battle of Liberty Gap, Tennessee, June 24–26, 1863.
Chickamauga Campaign, Georgia, August–September, 1863.
Battle of Chickamauga, Georgia, September 19–20, 1863.
Chattanooga Campaign, September to November 1863.
Battle of Missionary Ridge, Tennessee, November 25, 1863.
Battle of Ringgold Gap, Georgia, November 27, 1863.
Atlanta Campaign, May to September 1864.
Battle of Rocky Face Ridge, Georgia, May 5–11, 1864.
Battle of Resaca, Georgia, May 14–15, 1864.
Battle of New Hope Church, Georgia, May 25 - June 4, 1864.
Battle of Pickett's Mill, Georgina, May 27, 1864.
Battle of Kennesaw Mountain, Georgia, June 27, 1864.
Battle of Peachtree Creek, Georgia, July 20, 1864.
Siege of Atlanta, Georgia, July 22, 1864.
Battle of Jonesboro, Georgia, August 31 to September 1, 1864.
Franklin–Nashville Campaign, Alabama, Georgia and Tennessee, September 18 to December 27, 1864.
Battle of Spring Hill, Tennessee, November 29, 1864.
Battle of Franklin, Tennessee, November 30, 1864.
Battle of Nashville, Tennessee, December 15–16, 1864.
Carolinas Campaign, February to April 1865.
Battle of Bentonville, North Carolina, March 19–21, 1865.

See also

List of Arkansas Civil War Confederate units
Lists of American Civil War Regiments by State
Arkansas in the American Civil War
Arkansas Militia in the Civil War

References

Further reading
Arkansas Military Department Records, List of Commissioned Officers in State Militia 1827–1862, Microfilm Roll 00000038-8
Captain Mumford H. Dixon Diary, Special Collections, Robert W. Woodruff Library, Emory University
Fletcher, E. H. (1963). The Civil War letters of Captain Elliot H. Fletcher of Mill Bayou, Mississippi County, Arkansas: July to December, 1861. Little Rock, Ark.: Pulaski County Historical Society.
Sikakis, Stewart, Compendium of the Confederate Armies, Florida and Arkansas, Facts on File, Inc., 1992, 
United States. War Dept. The War of the Rebellion: A Compilation of the Official Records of the Union And Confederate Armies. Series 1, Volume 30, In Four Parts. Part 1, Reports., Book, 1890

External links
 Edward G. Gerdes Civil War Home Page
The Encyclopedia of Arkansas History and Culture 
The War of the Rebellion: a Compilation of the Official Records of the Union and Confederate Armies
The Arkansas History Commission, State Archives, Civil War in Arkansas

Units and formations of the Confederate States Army from Arkansas
1865 disestablishments in Arkansas
Military units and formations disestablished in 1865
Military units and formations in Arkansas
Military in Arkansas
1861 establishments in Arkansas
Military units and formations established in 1861
Artillery units and formations of the American Civil War